Bob Marley (1945–1981) was a Jamaican singer-songwriter and musician.

Marley may also refer to:

People
Marley (surname)
Baron Marley, a title in the Peerage of the United Kingdom
Dudley Aman, 1st Baron Marley
Alejandro Wiebe, nicknamed "Marley", Argentine TV host

People with the given name Marley
 Marley Aké (born 2001), French footballer
 Marley Carib (1947–2018), Japanese writer
 Marley Dias (born 2005), African-American activist and feminist
 Marley Marl (born 1962), American DJ
 Marley Shelton (born 1974), American actress
 Marley Shriver (1937–2016), American swimmer
 Marley Watkins (born 1990), Welsh footballer
 Marley Williams (born 1993), Australian rules footballer
 Marley Zarcone (born 1983), Canadian comic book artist

Fictional characters
Marley Kelly, a fictional character played by Luke Bailey in the BBC drama series Waterloo Road
Marley Love,  a fictional character from the NBC soap Another World then CBS soap As the World Turns
Jacob Marley, a fictional character from Charles Dickens' 1843 novella A Christmas Carol

Places
Marley, Canterbury, Kent, England
Marley, Dover, hamlet in Kent, England
Marley, Maidstone, hamlet in Kent, England
Marley, Illinois, United States

Other uses
Marley (film), a 2012 documentary on Bob Marley
Marley (soundtrack), a soundtrack album from the film
A Labrador Retriever featured in the book Marley & Me and the film based on it
Marley floor, a type of vinyl flooring used for dance

See also
Marly (disambiguation)

English-language unisex given names